Purana Pul (meaning old bridge in English), built in 1578 AD is a bridge over river Musi in Hyderabad, Telangana, India. It is the first bridge ever constructed in Hyderabad and among the oldest in South India.

It was built during the reign of Qutub Shahi dynasty, to connect Golconda and Hyderabad. The bridge is now defunct, and is used as a vegetable market but remains one of the oldest landmarks of Hyderabad. It was the only surviving bridge after the Great Musi Flood of 1908.

History
Prince Muhammad Quli Qutb Shah was in love with Bhagmati, a Hindu woman who lived on the other side of river Musi. His father Sultan Ibrahim Quli Qutub Shah decided to build the bridge so that his son could cross over the river safely. For this reason, it was also known as 'Pyar-ana pul' (meaning 'On Love Bridge' in English).

The Bridge
The bridge has 22 arches and is 600 feet long and 35 feet broad and 54 feet above the river bed.

Purana Pul Darwaza
There is a gateway called the Purana Pul Darwaza at the end of the bridge. It is one of the two surviving gateways of the city of Hyderabad, which was then enclosed by a city wall.

Reference List

External links

Picture of Purana pul 

Neighbourhoods in Hyderabad, India
Heritage structures in Hyderabad, India
Bridges in Telangana
Transport in Hyderabad, India
Bridges completed in 1578
1578 establishments in India